Lee Harvey may refer to:

 Lee Harvey (academic) (born 1949), British academic & policy analyst
 Lee Harvey (footballer) (born 1966), retired English footballer
 Lee Harvey, rapper on the 2001 song "Lapdance"

See also 
 Lee Harvey Oswald (1939–1963), assassin of American president John F. Kennedy 
 Tracie Andrews (born 1969), convicted murderer of her fiancé Lee Raymond Harvey